Stratosolar      
is a  startup corporation created to develop buoyant stratospheric platforms for collecting solar energy.   They have applied for two patents.

The current concept, "StratoSolar PV" envisions photovoltaic cells lifted above the clouds by means of lighter-than-air gas bags,
with up to 3.5X more power produced (per unit area) than ground-based solar arrays due to better exposure and also lower operating temperature.

The original concept was to concentrate and direct light concentrated by a buoyant cassegrain reflector telescope structure down a buoyant reflective pipe  to the ground for use in conventional steam turbine power generation.

In both cases, minimal land use compared to earth-based photovoltaics is a stated benefit.

References

External links 
 Company website

Companies based in San Jose, California
Renewable resource companies established in 2008
Solar energy companies of the United States
Energy companies established in 2008
2008 establishments in California